John Engle Miller III (born 1949) is an American marine biologist and retired bishop of the Anglican Church in North America. He is a former Episcopal priest who played an active role in the Anglican realignment in the United States. Consecrated in 2008 to serve as a bishop in the Anglican Mission in the Americas, Miller later served as assisting bishop in the Gulf Atlantic Diocese and provided interim support during episcopal vacancies and leaves of absence in the Anglican Diocese of the Great Lakes and the Anglican Diocese of the Upper Midwest.

Early life, education, and marine biology career
Miller is a native of Easton, Pennsylvania. He received his B.A. in zoology from the University of South Florida, where he also did graduate studies in marine biology. Miller worked as a marine biologist at the Smithsonian Institution in Washington and the Harbor Branch Oceanographic Institute in Fort Pierce, Florida, for eighteen years. His research was conducted from Bermuda to Antarctica and throughout the Caribbean Sea. He is married to Joyce and they have three adult children.

In 1990, Miller enrolled in Trinity School for Ministry. While there, he and his wife Joyce were spiritually influenced by the discipleship ministry of Thad and Erilynne Barnum in Aliquippa. Miller graduated in 1993 with an M.Div. and was ordained in the Episcopal Diocese of Central Florida.

Ordained ministry

Miller served as assistant rector and school chaplain at Holy Trinity Episcopal Church in Melbourne, Florida, in 1994, and as priest in charge from 1994 to 1996. From 1996 to 2004, he was rector of St. John's Episcopal Church in Melbourne. In 2004, he left the Episcopal Church and joined the Anglican Mission in the Americas, planting Prince of Peace Anglican Church in Melbourne. By 2008, Prince of Peace Anglican had grown to 400 members.

In 2007, the Rwandan bishops elected Miller to serve as a missionary bishop in the AMIA. He was consecrated in January 2008 by Emmanuel Kolini alongside Terrell Glenn and Philip Jones. Miller oversaw a network of more than 30 AMIA congregations in Florida, Georgia, and Alabama while remaining rector of Prince of Peace, as was customary for AMIA bishops.

In 2010, AMIA—which had been a founding member of the ACNA the year before—left full membership, changing its status in ACNA to "ministry partner." By the next year, the relationship between AMIA chairman Murphy and the Anglican Church of Rwanda's house of bishops, led by Kolini's successor Onesphore Rwaje, had broken down over questions of financial transparency and collegiality. Except for Glenn and Barnum, the AMIA bishops removed AMIA from Rwandan jurisdiction and restructured it as a "missionary society." In the fallout from AMIA's break with ACNA and Rwanda, some AMIA bishops—including Miller—transitioned directly into the ACNA. 

Miller accepted a call in 2012 as rector of Christ Church in Vero Beach, a four-year-old congregation in the recently formed Gulf Atlantic Diocese, where Miller was appointed assisting bishop. Miller was restored to membership in the ACNA College of Bishops in 2013. In 2017, Miller presided over the dedication of a new 27,000-square-foot facility for Christ Church, and in 2019, he retired as rector of Christ Church.

Later life
In retirement, Miller took on interim roles across the ACNA. From 2019 to 2020, he was interim bishop of the Diocese of the Great Lakes during the episcopal vacancy between Ronald Jackson and Mark Engel. From 2021 to 2022, after allegations of mishandling of abuse reports, Miller was acting bishop in the Diocese of the Upper Midwest, appointed by ACNA Primate Foley Beach and with delegated authority from the UMD's Bishop's Council during Stewart Ruch's leave of absence.

Miller also serves as a "soul care" counselor for clergy in partnership with Thad Barnum.

Bibliography

References

Living people
Bishops of the Anglican Church in North America
1949 births
American marine biologists
Anglican realignment people